Japan is an album by the British band Japan, released in the United States in March 1982 on the Epic Records label. It was the first US release of the band's material recorded for Virgin Records in the UK (Obscure Alternatives, on Ariola Records, had already been released in the US), and was a combination of most of Tin Drum with three tracks from Gentlemen Take Polaroids. It was released at a time when the band was beginning to break up. Despite the group's popularity in Europe and Asia, and a cult following in the US, the album did not break into the Billboard 200 chart. However, it did peak at number 204 on the Bubbling Under the Top LPs chart.

Reception
The album was reviewed in Billboard: "Coming in with its own version of stylish rock years ahead of Soft Cell, Human League, etc. yet behind Bowie and Roxy Music, Japan has gotten lost in the cracks. This album, though derivative, shows what Americans have been missing. This is well-played dance music which is also thought provoking because of its Far Eastern feel."

Reviewing for Musician, J. D. Considine wrote, "Instead of the cool, glassy textures and rigid rhythmic structure of most synth-rock, Japan has achieved a soft, almost organic sound reminiscent of Brian Eno's Another Green World or Before And After Science. At its worst, this is just high-tech atmosphere music with David Sylvain's dark, Brian Ferry-ish crooning adding just the right touch of melancholy. Mostly, though, Japan's deft mixture of synthetics, ethnic touches (like the African drums on "Talking Islands In Africa" or the dida on "Visions Of China") and unconventional dance rhythms makes for compelling listening."

Track listing

Personnel
Musicians
 Richard Barbieri – keyboard instruments, programming, tape, synthetic bass track B3
 Steve Jansen – drums, percussion instruments, electronic percussion, keyboards (percussion), keyboards track B3
 Mick Karn – fretless bass, African flute, dida, African drum track B3, percussion track B3
 David Sylvian – guitar, keyboard instruments, programming, tape, vocals, additional keyboards track B3
 Simon House – violin
 Yuka Fujii – vocals
 Ryuichi Sakamoto – keyboards track B3

Technical
 Japan – producers tracks: A1 to A3, B1 to B2, B5, remix track B3
 John Punter – producer, engineer tracks A4 & B4
 Steve Nye – engineer tracks: A1 to A3, B1 to B3, B5, remix track B3
 Renate Blauel – assistant engineer
 Colin Fairley – engineer tracks A4 & B4
 Nigel Walker – engineer tracks A4 & B4
 Steve Prestage – engineer tracks A4 & B4
 John Berg – artwork, design
 Fin Costello – photography
 Mastered at Columbia NY

Charts

References

Japan (band) albums
1982 compilation albums
Epic Records compilation albums